Pihl is a surname. Notable people with the surname include:

Abraham Pihl (1756–1821), Norwegian clergyman, astronomer and architect
Alexander Pihl (1920–2009), Norwegian physician
Alma Pihl (1888–1976), Fabergé workmaster
Andreas Pihl (born 1973), Swedish ice hockey player
Carl Abraham Pihl (1825–1897), Norwegian civil engineer
Einar Pihl (1926/1927 – 2009), Swedish sprint canoeist
Gary Pihl (born 1950), American musician
Gösta Pihl (1907–1992), Swedish sport shooter
Helena Pihl (born 1955), Swedish sprinter
Hollie Pihl (1928–2018), American judge
Jüri Pihl (1954–2019), Estonian politician
Oskar Pihl (1890–1959), Finnish silversmith and Fabergé workmaster
Raimo Pihl (born 1949), Swedish decathlete
Robert O. Pihl (born 1939), American psychologist
Tove Pihl (1924–1987), Norwegian educator and politician

See also
Anna Pihl, a Danish television series

Estonian-language surnames
Norwegian-language surnames
Swedish-language surnames